Wihthun (died ) was an early medieval Bishop of Selsey.

Life

Wihthun seems to have been appointed bishop in 789, as he appears last among the bishops in the witness list of a charter issued by Osfrith, King of Mercia, to Wærmund, Bishop of Rochester in that year.

Wihthun's last datable subscriptions are to two charters of 805: a grant by Cuthred, King of Kent, to Archbishop Wulfred, and a grant by Coenwulf, King of Mercia, and Cuthred, King of Kent, to a priest called Wulfhard. He also witnessed a grant from between 805 and 807 by Cuthred, King of Kent, to Æthelnoth, praefectus.

Wihthun died sometime after 805 and before 811.

Notes

Citations

References

Further reading

External links
 

Bishops of Selsey
8th-century English bishops
808 deaths